"Thubway Tham's Chrithtmath" is a short story written by Johnston McCulley. It first appeared in Detective Story Magazine on December 24, 1921.

External links

American short stories
1921 short stories
Crime short stories
Works originally published in Detective Story Magazine